甜蜜蜜 (pinyin: tián mì mì) may refer to:

 Comrades: Almost a Love Story, a 1996 Hong King film
 甜蜜蜜, a book by Theresa Fu
 "甜蜜蜜", a song by Teresa Teng, derivative of Indonesian folk song "Dayung Sampan"
 "甜蜜蜜", a song from Smile (Fiona Sit album)
 "甜蜜蜜", a song from Star Track (album) by Leo Ku